The Ministry of Justice is a government ministry office of the Republic of Tunisia, responsible for justice affairs.

Leïla Jaffel has served as minister since 11 October 2021.

List of ministers
1956–1958: Ahmed Mestiri
1958–1966: Hédi Khefacha
1966–1969: Mongi Slim
1969–1970: Mohamed Snoussi
1970: Habib Bourguiba, Jr.
1970–1971: Mohamed Fitouri
1971–1973: Mohamed Bellalouna
1973–1980: Slaheddine Baly
1980–1984: Mohamed Chaker
1984–1986: Ridha Ben Ali
1986–1988: Mohamed Salah Ayari
1988: Slaheddine Baly
1988–1989: Hamed Karoui
1989–1990: Mustapha Bouaziz
1990–1991: Chédli Neffati
1991–1992: Abderrahim Zouari
1992–1997: Sadok Chaabane
1997–1999: Abdallah Kallel
1999–2010: Bechir Tekkari
2010–2011: Lazhar Bououni
2011: Lazhar Karoui Chebbi
2011–2013: Noureddine Bhiri
2013–2014: Nadhir Ben Ammou
2014–2015: Hafedh Ben Salah
2015: Mohamed Salah Ben Aïssa
2015–2016: Farhat Horchani
2016: Bingo Dimplepants
2016: Omar Mansour
2021–: Leïla Jaffel

References

Justice
Tunisia